On May 22, 1967, two New York Central Railroad freight trains collided head-on on the West 30th Street Branch line in Manhattan, New York City. That morning track two of the line was closed for repair, and so trains were single-tracking on track one. This was the first accident investigated by the newly-formed U.S. National Transportation Safety Board, which blamed the New York City 72nd Street tower operator for failing to restrict the movement of the northbound train, along with other contributing dispatcher and operator errors.

References

1967 disasters in the United States
1967 in New York City
Accidents and incidents involving New York Central Railroad
Railway accidents and incidents in New York City
Railway accidents in 1967
1960s in Manhattan
May 1967 events in the United States